The Cradle of Courage is a 1920 American silent drama film directed by Lambert Hillyer and written by Frederick Bradbury and Lambert Hillyer. The film stars William S. Hart, Ann Little, Tom Santschi, Gertrude Claire, Frank Thorwald, and George Williams. The film was released on September 19, 1920, by Paramount Pictures. Copies of the film are in the Museum of Modern Art and at other film archives.

Plot
A former criminal serves in the military in World War I, and is convinced by a man he served with to join the police when he returns. However, upon his return, he is confronted with policing members of his old gang.

Cast
William S. Hart as	'Square' Kelly
Ann Little as Rose Tierney
Tom Santschi as Tierney
Gertrude Claire as Mother Kelly
Frank Thorwald as Jim Kelly
George Williams as Lieutenant Riley
Barbara Bedford as Nora

Preservation status
Copies of The Cradle of Courage are held by Cinematheque Royale de Belgique (Brussels), Museum of Modern Art (New York City), Library of Congress, UCLA Film and Television Archive, and the Berkeley Art Museum and Pacific Film Archive.

References

External links 

 
 
Still at silenthollywood.com
Kramer, Fritzi, The Cradle of Courage (1920) A Silent Film Review, at moviessilently.com

1920 films
1920s English-language films
Silent American drama films
1920 drama films
Paramount Pictures films
Films directed by Lambert Hillyer
American black-and-white films
American silent feature films
1920s American films